The 2003 Ordina Open was a tennis tournament played on grass courts in Rosmalen, 's-Hertogenbosch in the Netherlands that was part of the International Series of the 2003 ATP Tour and of Tier III of the 2003 WTA Tour. The tournament was held from 16 June until 22 June 2003. Sjeng Schalken and Kim Clijsters won the singles titles.

Finals

Men's singles

 Sjeng Schalken defeated  Arnaud Clément 6–3, 6–4
 It was Schalken's 1st title of the year and the 8th of his career.

Women's singles

 Kim Clijsters defeated  Justine Henin-Hardenne 6–7(4–7), 3–0 (Henin-Hardenne retired)
 It was Clijsters' 4th title of the year and the 14th of her career.

Men's doubles

 Martin Damm /  Cyril Suk defeated  Donald Johnson /  Leander Paes 7–5, 7–6(7–4)
 It was Damm's 2nd title of the year and the 25th of his career. It was Suk's 2nd title of the year and the 26th of his career.

Women's doubles

 Elena Dementieva /  Lina Krasnoroutskaya defeated  Nadia Petrova /  Mary Pierce 2–6, 6–3, 6–4
 It was Dementieva's 2nd title of the year and the 6th of her career. It was Krasnoroutskaya's only title of the year and the 1st of her career.

External links
 
 ATP tournament profile
 WTA tournament profile

Ordina Open
Ordina Open
Rosmalen Grass Court Championships
2003 in Dutch tennis